The Rashaida Free Lions (الأسود الحُرة) are an armed group of the Rashaida people that was active in the eastern regions of Sudan.  The Free Lions were formed in November 1999 by Mabrouk Mubarak Salim.  

While the political grievances articulated by the Free Lions, like those of their allies the Beja Congress, revolve around the effects of large mechanized agricultural schemes upon traditional life, the act which mobilized the Rashaida into action was the government confiscation of 400 vehicles the government of Kuwait had given them in thanks for their political support during the 1991 Gulf War. The Rashaida had immigrated from Saudi Arabia only in the late 19th century and have extensive family ties with Kuwait.

In March 2005, the Free Lions agreed to an alliance with the larger Beja Congress under the Eastern Front umbrella. Although the Eastern Front later was joined by the Justice and Equality Movement, the Free Lions never gained a wide base of support amongst their people, and relied on their skill as businessmen and smugglers—as well as Eritrean support—to fund their activities. In the end, their ties to Kuwaiti parliamentarians played a large role in mediating the October 2006 peace agreement between the Eastern Front and the Sudanese government.

References

External links
"Sudan: Saving Peace in the East", International Crisis Group, 5 January 2006, pp. 17–18

History of Sudan
Politics of Sudan
Rebel groups in Sudan